Northeastern University (NEU) is a Chinese public research university in Shenyang, Liaoning province with strengths in engineering and architecture. It is known for its prominent role in the information technology industry.

The university's academic motto is "Striving endlessly for self-improvement, combining knowledge and action as one", the first half of which is from the ancient Chinese classic Yijing, and the latter is a direct quote from Wang Yangming and also translated as "thinking-doing to theory" by the NEU's Engineering faculty.

Having built China's first electronic analog computer, university research park, and university-run commercial enterprise, Northeastern is now part of a government plan to revitalize the Northeast China economy with a focus on high-tech manufacturing. Its alumni include the founder and CEO of Neusoft, the largest Chinese IT and software outsourcing corporation, the first Olympic athlete to represent China, in the 1932 Summer Olympics, and the founder of Amnesty International in Taiwan.

With a total enrollment of over 20,000 students, Northeastern has received significant government funding through the Double First Class University Plan, former 211 Project and 985 Project, initiatives which sought to elevate the research standards of rising Chinese universities. In 2017, Northeastern was selected by the Chinese Ministry of Education as a Class B institution in the national Double First Class University Plan, a major government initiative to comprehensively develop a group of elite universities into "world-class institutions" by 2050.

History

The Northeastern University was founded on April 26, 1923, in Shenyang (then known as Fengtian), in response to warlord Zhang Zuolin's order in early 1921 to establish tertiary education and expand the talent pool of the Northeast.  After Zhang Zuolin's assassination by the Japanese, his son Zhang Xueliang inherited the command of the Northeast, assumed the title of co-president of the university in August 1928, and became the university's most important financial and political patron in its early history.  With Zhang's generous support, the institution attracted top scholars and educators from throughout the nation (e.g. Zhang Shizhao, Huang Kan, Liang Sicheng and Lin Huiyin), and quickly developed into a top-tier comprehensive university, with six schools for science, engineering, humanities, law, agriculture and education.  By the end of the 1920s, it was the biggest and best-resourced tertiary institute in China, with a budget tripling that of the Peking University.

Less than a decade after the university was founded, the Imperial Japanese Kwantung Army attacked and captured Shenyang on September 18, 1931, and then proceeded to invade and annex all of Northeast China and reorganized the region into the puppet state of Manchukuo.  the Northeastern University was forced to evacuate its campus after the fall of Shenyang and became the first exiled university in Chinese history, being relocated to Beiping during the height of the December 9th Movement, with its more than 70 students continuing their study at the then-private Nankai University.  Five years later, the university was relocated further west to Xi'an in 1936, then temporarily to a borrowed Henan University campus at Kaifeng in January 1937, before renamed National Northeastern University and relocated back to Xi'an in June.

After the Marco Polo Bridge Incident on July 7, 1937, the Japanese launched a full-scale invasion of North China.  Like many other national universities in China during the Second Sino-Japanese War, the Northeastern University was again displaced in 1938 and relocated further away from the approaching front line to Santai in Sichuan, where it remained for the next 8 years and contributed to the establishment of the National Northwest Institute of Technology (the precursor of Northwestern Polytechnical University and Tianjin University).  After Japan's surrender, the university returned to its original campus in Shenyang in May 1946, while some staff of its Education faculty remained in Sichuan and later became the Sichuan Normal University and China West Normal University.

After the establishment of the People's Republic of China in 1949, Northeastern University was renamed Northeast Institute of Technology (NIT) in August 1950 and became primarily an engineering school, before finally reverting to its original name of Northeastern University on March 8, 1993.

Northeastern University was selected to participate in the 211 Project and Project 985, nationwide government initiatives to expand and modernize the Chinese university system, including significant government funding and subsidies for constructing state-of-the-art academic facilities. The university is also part of the national government's initiative to replace Northeast China's heavy manufacturing industry with a modern high-tech manufacturing economy.

Academics

Northeastern University consists of the School of Liberal Arts and Law, the School of Business Administration, the School of Sciences, the School of Resources and Civil Engineering, the School of Materials Science and Metallurgy, the School of Mechanical Engineering and Automation, the School of Information Science and Engineering, Sino-Dutch School of Biomedical and Information Engineering, and the Department of Foreign Languages.  It has 46 undergraduate programs, 53 master's degree programs, and 23 doctoral degree programs, as well as an adult education program.

Rankings and Reputation 

In 2020, the Academic Ranking of World Universities (ARWU) ranked NEU at 301-400th globally. From the same rankings by subjects, "Metallurgical Engineering" was ranked at fourth in the world, together with "Instrumental Science", "Mining Engineering", "Control Science and Engineering", and "Computer Science and Engineering", placed in the global top 100.

The U.S. News & World Report Best Global University Ranking 2022 ranked NEU as 668th in the world, 149th in Asia and 62nd in China.             "Electrical and Electronic Engineering", "Mechanical Engineering" and "Chemical Engineering" were ranked in the global top 100, while "Material Science", "Engineering", "Nanoscience and Nanotechnology", "Energy and Fuels", "Computer Science", "Condensed Matter Physics", "Physical Chemistry" and "Optics" were placed in the global top 300 according to the same ranking.

In 2020, the Times Higher Education ranked the university within the 801-1000 band globally.

Campus

There are currently two campuses in Shenyang and one campus in Qinhuangdao, Hebei province.

Northeastern's two campuses in Shenyang are referred to as South Lake Campus and Hunnan Campus. The South Lake Campus in Heping District, was built in 1952 and spans . The Hunnan Campus in Hunnan District, was built in 2013 and occupies .

The official name of its Qinhuangdao campus is Northeastern University at Qinhuangdao. The campus was built at the Haigang District in 1976 and occupies .

Notable people

Faculty 
 Zhang Xueliang, the warlord who controlled Northeast China during the Second Sino-Japanese War and instigated the Xi'an Incident, and was President of Northeastern University
 Liang Sicheng, the "father of modern Chinese architecture", founded the Department of Architecture at Northeastern
 Lin Huiyin (Phyllis Lin), the first female architect in modern China, taught in the Department of Architecture
 Ding Lieyun, management scientist and educator, President of Northeastern University (2011-2014) and elected a member of the Chinese Academy of Engineering

Prominent alumni 
 Liu Jiren '80, computer scientist and CEO of Neusoft Group (an acronym of "Northeastern University Software"), the largest IT and software outsourcing corporation in China
 Bo Yang, author and dissident of the Kuomintang dictatorship during Taiwan's White Terror period, and founder of Amnesty International in Taiwan
 Liu Changchun, sprinter who was the first athlete to represent China (as the Republic of China) in the Olympic Games during the 1932 Summer Olympics
 Shan Tianfang, famous Chinese pingshu performer and member of the China Society for Literature Popular Research
 Guo Xiaochuan, Chinese poet and communist Eighth Route Army soldier considered a leading figure in the "political lyric poetry" style

See also
Neusoft Group (acronym of "Northeastern University Software"), the largest IT and software outsourcing corporation in China
Double First Class University Plan, a major government initiative to cultivate an elite group of Chinese universities to "world-class" status by 2050

References

External links

Northeastern University of China (Official website)

 
Educational institutions established in 1923
Project 211
Project 985
Universities and colleges in Shenyang
1923 establishments in China